Partur Assembly constituency is one of 288 assembly constituencies of Maharashtra state of India. It comes under Parbhani (Lok Sabha constituency) for Indian general elections.

Geographical Scope
This constituency includes Partur and Mantha tehsils.

Members of Legislative Assembly

See also
 2014 Maharashtra Legislative Assembly election

References

Assembly constituencies of Maharashtra
Assembly constituencies of Jalna district